Lisa Dennison is the chairman of Sotheby's North and South America. She was previously the director of the Solomon R. Guggenheim Museum in New York City. She became director around 2005, and resigned around 2007 to work at the auction house Sotheby's, where she is now Chairperson.

Early life and career
Dennison grew up in New Jersey and attended Wellesley College, earning a Bachelor of Arts degree in Art History and French in 1975. She also attended Brown University, receiving a Master of Arts degree in Art History there in 1978.

Dennison first worked at the Guggenheim as a summer intern of Wellesley College in 1973; in 1978 she began working there independently. She worked as an exhibition coordinator, assistant curator, and deputy director and chief curator. In October 2005, she became the director of the museum. At that time, she was also approached by the Los Angeles County Museum of Art and the Cleveland Museum of Art to work as a director there. She replaced seventeen-year director Thomas Krens, who was also the director of the Guggenheim Foundation.

As director of the Guggenheim, Dennison organized 35 shows, one of which was a traveling exhibition of 125 works in the Guggenheim’s collection.

References

Solomon R. Guggenheim Foundation
1953 births
Living people